The 14th Army Group was a field formation of the People's Liberation Army during the Chinese Civil War. It was organized in March 1949.

At its activation, the Army Group's commander was Liu Yalou, commissar was Mo Wenhua, 1st deputy commander Huang Yongsheng, deputy commissar Wu Faxian.

The Army Group was composed of 39th, 41st, and 42nd Corps.

In July 1949, roughly 3 months after its activation, the 14th Army Group was inactivated and converted as headquarters, People's Liberation Army Air Force.

It should be clearly noted that William W. Whitson, writing with Chen-Hsia Huang in The Chinese High Command, 1972, lists a 14th Army (rather than Army Group) under the Fourth Field Army in the June–September 1949 period, and gives its composition as the 48th Corps (142nd, 143rd, and 144th Divisions) and the 54th Corps (160th, 161st, and 162nd Divisions). He lists the commander during that period as Ch'en Ch'i-han.

References

Bibliography
William W. Whitson, with Chen-hsia Huang. (1973) The Chinese high command; a history of Communist military politics, 1927-71. Foreword by Lucian W. Pye.

External links
陆军军史：中国人民解放军第14兵团, http://www.360doc.com/content/12/0825/00/436642_232190707.shtml

Land forces units and formations of the People's Republic of China
Military units and formations established in 1949
Military units and formations disestablished in 1949